Uma Jalsu (Aymara for spring, source, Hispanicized spelling Humajalso) is a mountain in the Andes of southern Peru, about  high. It is located in the Puno Region, El Collao Province, Capazo District. Uma Jalsu lies west of the mountain Jiwaña and southeast of Wila Chunkara. It lies at a plain named Jiwaña Pampa (Jihuaña Pampa). The Jiwaña River originates near the mountain. It flows through the plain before it reaches the Mawri River (Mauri).

References

Mountains of Puno Region
Mountains of Peru